Lockheart Indigo is an independent adventure game developed by Fangsoft (originally credited Harmless Games). It is a neo-noir psychological thriller that's visually styled after 8-bit video games such as those on the Game Boy Color, using limited colors with a pixel art aesthetic.

The player controls Beatris Summers, a young private detective hired to solve the murder of the business owner, known as Evan Volkov. Beatris must attempt to interrogate one of the residents who commit the crime behind the wealthy robotics tycoon in the mansion.

The game was released commercially on July 31, 2020 on Steam and itch.io. It was made available as freeware on December 21, 2020.

Gameplay 
Lockheart Indigo is a top-down adventure game where the player traverses levels and navigate obstacles similar to the 2D installments of The Legend of Zelda, seeking out keys and opening locked doors. Potential culprits are interrogated in a conversation system that uses facts, evidence, and special abilities to get closer to the killer and progress the game.

Synopsis 
The game features Beatris Summers, a young, cynical private detective who must solve the murder of the late business owner, Evan Volkov. Beatris is hired by the victim's widow, Aya Volkov, to investigate the residents of the Volkov estate and discover which of them committed the crime. Upon traversing further into the mansion, Beatris finds herself tangled up in a deeper and more dangerous mystery.

1919 
When you find and ask the painter in eight different locations to get the ribbon and collect two testaments, go to the garden to meet a mysterious person, Jared.

Characters 

 Beatris Summers: An early-20s aged private detective
 Aya Volkov: Widow of the victim
 Ivan Volkov: A greedy businessman
 Nasha Volkov: A genius scientist
 Yvon Volkov: A handy man

Development and release 
Lockheart Indigo was developed independently by Harmless using the RPG Maker MV game engine.  Development started in 2017 after creating the prototype Machines That Bleed.

Prior to the game's full release on Steam (July 2020), it was available for free as a beta version throughout its development on itch.io.

References

External links 

 Official website

2020 video games
Mystery adventure games
RPG Maker games
Detective video games
Video games featuring female protagonists
Neo-noir video games
Video games about artificial intelligence
Windows-only games
Windows games